Anarchias allardicei is a moray eel commonly known as the Allardice's moray. It is light brown in color, and is found in coral reefs in the Pacific and Indian Oceans.

References

allardicei
Fish of the Indian Ocean
Fish of the Pacific Ocean
Fish described in 1906
Taxa named by David Starr Jordan